{{Infobox university
| name              = École de l'air et de l'espace
| native_name       = 
| image        = Insigne EA 2015.png
| image_size        = 250px
| caption           = School crest
| motto             = « Faire face » (French)(also motto of the French Air and Space Force)
| mottoeng          = « Face honestly, truthfully & correctly  straight forward »| established       = 1933
| closed            = 
| type              = Air Force Academy, Grande École 
| affiliation       = 
| endowment         = 
| budget            = 
| officer_in_charge = 
| chairman          = 
| chancellor        = 
| president         = 
| vice-president    = 
| superintendent    = 
| provost           = 
| vice_chancellor   = 
| rector            = Brigadier General Dominique Arbiol
| principal         = 
| dean              = 
| director          = Brigadier General Dominique Arbiol
| head_label        = 
| head              = 
| academic_staff    = 
| administrative_staff  = 
| students          = 500 
| undergrad         = 
| postgrad          = 
| doctoral          = 
| other             = 
| city              = Salon-de-Provence, Provence-Alpes-Côte d'Azur
| country           = France
| coor              = 
| campus            = 
| former_names      = 
| free_label        = 
| free              = 
| colors            = 
| colours           = 
| athletics         = 
| sports            = 
| other_name          = EAE
| mascot            = 
| affiliations      = CDEFI, CGE, PEGASUS
| website           = 
| logo              = 
| footnotes         = 
}}

The École de l'air et de l'espace is a military school and grande école training line officers in the French Air and Space Force.  It is located at Salon-de-Provence Air Base in Salon-de-Provence, France.

History

In 1922, the École du génie (School of Engineering) of Versailles, was entrusted with the mission to train all officers and aircrew in aeronautics.

The École militaire et d’application de l’Aéronautique (Military and Aeronautical School) was set up in 1925. The officer cadets from the non-commissioned officers' corps and young officers from the École Spéciale Militaire de Saint-Cyr and École Polytechnique attended training at Versailles for two years. For pilots, their training then continued at Avord and then Cazaux, where they trained in aerial combat and bombing.

President Albert Lebrun created the École de l'air et de l'espace by Presidential decree in 1933.  The school's first class began training November 4, 1935.  The school's motto, Faire Face ("Overcoming") is a tribute to Capitaine Georges Guynemer, a World War I fighter ace

In 1937, the school moved into still-unfinished buildings in Salon, Bouches-du-Rhône.  The outbreak of World War II forced the school to relocate several times from 1939 to 1945, to sites including Bordeaux, Collioure, and Marrakech.  It was not until 1946 that the school returned to the now-completed campus at Salon.  The school received the Legion of Honor and the Croix de Guerre from President Vincent Auriol in 1947.

Other specialized schools joined the École de l'air et de l'espace, including the École du commissariat de l'Air, which trains administrative, legal, and financial officers, in 1953, and the Cours Spécial de l'École de l'air et de l'espace (CSEA), which trains exchange cadets from French-speaking African countries, in 1973.

In 1969, the École de l'air et de l'espace began an exchange program with the United States Air Force Academy, for eight cadets per school each year.

The school first accepted women in 1976.

Since 2008, The École de l'air et de l'espace also proposes two mastères spécialisés courses  in aviation safety aircraft airworthiness and aerospace project management in partnership with the École nationale de l'aviation civile and the Institut Supérieur de l'Aéronautique et de l'Espace.MS Aerospace Project Management 

In 2015, The École de l'air et de l'espace launched a MOOC titled Compréhension de l’Arme Aérienne'' (Understanding Air Power) on France Université Numérique's platform.

Notable alumni 

 Stéphane Abrial, French General who is the previous Commander of Allied Command Transformation
 Caroline Aigle, first woman fighter pilot in the French Air Force
 Patrick Baudry, retired Lieutenant Colonel in the French Air Force and a former CNES astronaut
 Jean-Loup Chrétien,  former CNES spationaut
 Olivier Dassault, former French politician and billionaire businessman, who served as a deputy in the National Assembly.
 Léopold Eyharts, ESA astronaut
 Jean-Pierre Haigneré, French Air Force officer and a former CNES spationaut
 Fleury Marius, French aviator
 Francis Pollet, Director of the Institut Polytechnique des Sciences Avancées
 Jacques Rosay, Vice President Chief Test Pilot of the aircraft manufacturer Airbus
 Michel Tognini, French test pilot, brigadier general in the French Air Force, and a former CNES and ESA astronaut

References

Aviation schools
Aviation schools in France
Air force academies
Grandes écoles
Military academies of France
Educational institutions established in 1933
Education in Provence-Alpes-Côte d'Azur
Training establishments of the French Air and Space Force
1933 establishments in France